Alan of Brittany may refer to:

Alan I, King of Brittany (ruled 876–907), nicknamed the Great
Alan II, Duke of Brittany (ruled 938–952), nicknamed Wrybeard
Alan, Count of Nantes (988–90), may also have been duke of Brittany
Alan III, Duke of Brittany (ruled 1008–1040)
Alan IV, Duke of Brittany (ruled 1084–1119), nicknamed Fergant